Besnik Musaj (born 29 December 1973) is an Albanian former cyclist who represented his country in the 1996 Summer Olympics. He competed in the men's road race, but he failed to finish the race. He won the Tour of Albania for seven consecutive years from 1995 to 2001, and the Albanian National Road Race Championships in 1998, 1999 and 2002.

References

1973 births
Living people
Cyclists at the 1996 Summer Olympics
Summer Olympics competitors for Albania
Place of birth missing (living people)